Tjun Tjun is a retired Chinese-Indonesian badminton player.

Career
Though a world level singles player early in his career, he became one of the sport's greatest ever doubles specialists. His game was notable for its speed, power, accuracy, and aggressiveness. He is the brother of Liang Qiu-xia, also a  badminton player and coach.

Tjun Tjun became world champion in men's doubles with Johan Wahjudi at the very first IBF World Championships held in 1977. They also won 6 of the 7 All England Open Badminton Championships held from 1974 through 1980. They were clearly the world's number one team during this period, often beating fellow countrymen Christian Hadinata and Ade Chandra in the finals of major events. Playing one stint at singles and regularly in doubles (first with Rudy Hartono, and later with Wahjudi) Tjun Tjun won all of his matches in three consecutive Thomas Cup campaigns (1973, 1976, 1979), all of which resulted in world team titles for Indonesia. He was elected to the World Badminton Hall of Fame in 2009.

Achievements

World Championships 
Men's doubles

Asian Games 
Men's doubles

Mixed doubles

Asian Championships 
Men's doubles

Southeast Asian Games 
Men's doubles

International Open Tournaments (13 titles, 4 runners-up)

Men's doubles

Men's singles

Mixed doubles

Invitational tournament 

Men's doubles

Men's singles

Mixed doubles

References

Indonesian male badminton players
Indonesian sportspeople of Chinese descent
Living people
Asian Games medalists in badminton
Badminton players at the 1974 Asian Games
Asian Games gold medalists for Indonesia
Asian Games silver medalists for Indonesia
Southeast Asian Games gold medalists for Indonesia
Southeast Asian Games medalists in badminton
1952 births
Medalists at the 1974 Asian Games
Competitors at the 1977 Southeast Asian Games
People from Cirebon
Sportspeople from West Java